The Hat is a Southern California fast-food restaurant chain specializing in pastrami dip sandwiches. This eatery, once local only to the San Gabriel Valley, has been offering its "World Famous Pastrami" to Southern California residents since 1951. Its customers consume 13 to 15 tons of pastrami per week.

History
The original Hat Restaurant was located at the intersection of 3rd Street and Ford Boulevard in Boyle Heights (now known as East Los Angeles).  The original location is now a King Taco.  The second store was opened by a relative of the original founders Maurice Maretsky and Alvin Annenberg and located at Garfield & Valley in Alhambra.  This store has been often represented as the original location but it is not.  Although the 3 window design is the same as the original.  The Hat has been serving World Famous pastrami dip sandwiches since 1951. The current company has kept to its roots by keeping its retro neon signs featuring a chef’s toque and the words "World Famous Pastrami”.

Menu
The pastrami dip sandwich is the restaurant's signature item. It comes on a French roll with mustard and pickle. The restaurant also serves burgers, dogs, sandwiches, onion rings, fries and chili cheese fries. The Hat may have been one of the first places to feature the pastrami burger. The Hat offers no table service, so all of the items are wrapped to go, but paper plates are given to customers who wish to "dine in."

Locations
There are 11 locations around Los Angeles, Riverside, Orange, Ventura, and San Bernardino counties.

Gallery

References

Restaurants established in 1951
Restaurants in California